Landeleau is a commune in the Finistère department of Brittany in north-western France.

Population
Inhabitants of Landeleau are called in French Landeleausiens.

Map

See also
Communes of the Finistère department

References

External links

Official website 

Mayors of Finistère Association 

Communes of Finistère